Wyatt Earp is a 1994 American biographical Western drama film directed and produced by Lawrence Kasdan, and co-written by Kasdan and Dan Gordon. The film covers the lawman of the same name's life, from an Iowa farmboy, to a feared marshal, to the feud in Tombstone, Arizona that led to the O.K. Corral gunfight. Starring Kevin Costner in the title role, it features an ensemble supporting cast that includes Gene Hackman, Mark Harmon, Michael Madsen, Bill Pullman, Dennis Quaid, Isabella Rossellini, Tom Sizemore, JoBeth Williams, Mare Winningham and Jim Caviezel in one of his earliest roles.

The film was released a mere six months after the similar Tombstone, and received mixed to negative reviews, critical of the film's length and plot but praising its production values. Unlike Tombstone, it was a box office failure.

Plot
During the American Civil War, teenaged Wyatt Earp lives on his family's farm in Pella, Iowa, while his older brothers Virgil and James serve with the Union Army. Wyatt attempts to run away, intending to lie about his age and join his brothers in the war, but his father catches him. His brothers return home at the war's end, with James gravely wounded, and the family moves west to start over. Wyatt sees a man being shot dead in a duel and vomits at the sight.

Years later, a teenaged Wyatt works as a wagon driver and earns extra money by acting as a referee for boxing matches. A bully tries to shoot him after a drunken argument, but Wyatt disarms him, taking his gun. Returning home to Missouri, Wyatt marries his childhood sweetheart, Urilla Sutherland. They move into their own house, and he begins working as a lawman. Months later, his pregnant wife dies from typhoid fever. After staying by her side through the illness, Wyatt becomes deeply depressed. Burning their home and possessions, he begins drinking and drifts from town to town, landing in Pine Bluff, Arkansas. He robs a man and steals his horse but is quickly arrested. With Wyatt facing certain hanging, his father bails him out of jail, telling him to never return to Arkansas.

Working as a buffalo hunter, Wyatt befriends Bat Masterson and his brother Ed Masterson. Years pass, and Wyatt becomes a deputy marshal in Wichita, Kansas, building a reputation as a man unafraid to enforce the law. He is recruited to work for the police force in Dodge City, with a lower salary but earning extra money for every arrest. Wyatt becomes romantically involved with a prostitute, Mattie Blaylock, and persuades the Matersons to come on as his deputies. Wyatt believes Ed is too passive, but the Dodge City council fires Wyatt for repeated complaints of excessive force, appointing Ed to take his place. Wyatt starts working for the railroad to catch robbers.

Pursuing outlaw Dave Rudabaugh, Wyatt is introduced to gunman and gambler Doc Holliday in Fort Griffin, Texas, and the two become friends. Holliday assists Earp in locating Rudabaugh, whom he dislikes tremendously. Wyatt receives word that Ed has been killed, having shot and killed both his assailants before dying in the street. Wyatt returns to Dodge City and soon after kills his first man, witnessed by actress Josie Marcus. Despite his brothers' wives’ and Mattie's protests, Wyatt moves the family to Tombstone, Arizona and immediately finds himself at odds with the outlaw Cowboy gang. He becomes romantically involved with Josie Marcus, angering her boyfriend Sheriff Behan and stressing his relationship with Mattie, and becomes the subject of rumor about town.

Wyatt and his brothers Morgan and Virgil arrest several Cowboys, and Virgil assumes the post of head marshal following the murder of Fred White by a Cowboy. Tension builds between the brothers and the gang as Wyatt breaks up several altercations involving the Cowboys, particularly Ike Clanton, and Holliday swears his loyalty to Wyatt, whom he considers his only real friend. The Gunfight at the O.K. Corral makes the brothers very unpopular in town as many citizens feel that they deliberately provoked the shootout. Virgil is ambushed and wounded, and Morgan is killed. In the Vendetta Ride, Wyatt forms a posse with his friends to hunt down and take revenge against the remaining Cowboys.

Many years later, Wyatt and Josie mine for gold in Alaska. A young man on the same boat recognizes Wyatt and recounts a story in which Wyatt had saved the boy's uncle, "Tommy Behind-The-Deuce". Wyatt says to Josie, "Some people say it didn't happen that way", to which she responds, "Never mind them, Wyatt. It happened that way." An epilogue states that Holliday died six years later in a hospital in Glenwood Springs, Colorado. Members of the Clanton gang continued to die mysteriously for years after Morgan's murder. Josie and Wyatt's marriage lasted 47 years until Wyatt died at age 80 in Los Angeles.

Cast

Production
Costner was originally involved with the film Tombstone, another film about Wyatt Earp, written by Kevin Jarre of Glory. However, Costner disagreed with Jarre over the focus of the film (he believed that the emphasis should have been on Wyatt Earp rather than the many characters in Jarre's script) and left the project, eventually teaming up with Kasdan to produce his own Wyatt Earp project. The film was also originally meant to be a six-hour miniseries until Kevin Costner joined the cast. Costner proceeded to use his then-considerable clout to convince most of the major studios to refuse to distribute the competing film, which affected casting on the rival project.

Soundtrack

The score was composed by James Newton Howard, conducted by Marty Paich with The Hollywood Recording Musicians Orchestra and released by Warner Bros. Records in 1994. It was later re-released in 2013 in an expanded edition by La-La Land.

 "Main Title"
 "Home from the War"
 "Going to Town"
 "The Wagon Chase"
 "Mattie Wants Children"
 "Railroad"
 "Nicholas Springs Wyatt"
 "Is That Your Hat?"
 "The Wedding"
 "Stillwell Makes Bail"
 "It All Ends Now"
 "Urilla Dies"
 "Tell Me About Missouri"
 "The Night Before"
 "O.K. Corral"
 "Down by the River"
 "Kill 'Em All"
 "Dodge City"
 "Leaving Dodge" 
 "Indian Charlie"
 "We Stayed Too Long" 
 "Winter to Spring"
 "It Happened That Way"

Release

Box office
Wyatt Earp, released six months after Tombstone, grossed $56 million on a $63 million budget, compared to Tombstone'''s $73 million gross on a $25 million budget. The film opened at number 4 at the US box office, grossing $7.5 million in its first week. It grossed $25 million in the United States and Canada, compared to Tombstone $56 milion. Internationally, Wyatt Earp was more successful grossing $31 million, compared to Tombstone $17 million, but this was not enough to recoup its budget, making it a box office bomb.

Later Dennis Quaid said:“I personally thought it was too long. But I'm also really proud of it.“

Critical receptionWyatt Earp received mixed to negative reviews from critics. Review aggregator Rotten Tomatoes retrospectively gives the film a "rotten" score of 31%, based on 83 reviews, with an average rating of 5.4/10. The site's consensus states: "Easy to admire yet difficult to love, Wyatt Earp buries eye-catching direction and an impressive cast in an undisciplined and overlong story." On Metacritic, the film has a score of 47 out of 100 based on 20 reviews, indicating “mixed or average reviews.”  Roger Ebert of the Chicago Sun-Times gave the film 2 out of 4 stars, saying "Wyatt Earp plays as if they took Tombstone and pumped it full of hot air. It involves many of the same characters and much of the same story, but little of the tension and drama. It's a rambling, unfocused biography of Wyatt Earp (Kevin Costner), starting when he's a kid and following his development from an awkward would-be lawyer into a slick gunslinger. This is a long journey, in a three-hour film that needs better pacing."

Todd McCarthy of Variety praised the cast and production values, but remarked, "If you're going to ask an audience to sit through a three-hour, nine-minute rendition of an oft-told story, it would help to have a strong point of view on your material and an urgent reason to relate it. Such is not the case with Wyatt Earp." Similarly, Caryn James of The New York Times complimented the film's ambition and effort to portray a more human Wyatt, but still felt that "the film's literal-minded approach to the hero's dark soul is one of its terrible problems. 'Wyatt Earp' labors to turn this mythic figure into a complex man; instead it makes him a cardboard cutout and his story a creepingly slow one."

Audiences surveyed by CinemaScore gave the film a grade "B+" on scale of A to F.

Year-end worst-of lists
 2nd – Peter Travers, Rolling Stone 2nd – Dan Craft, The Pantagraph 4th – Glenn Lovell, San Jose Mercury News 7th – Robert Denerstein, Rocky Mountain News 8th – John Hurley, Staten Island Advance Top 12 (Alphabetically ordered, not ranked) – David Elliott, The San Diego Union-TribuneAccolades

American Film Institute nominated the film in AFI's 100 Years of Film Scores

See also
 Tombstone – starring Kurt Russell as Wyatt Earp, released around the same time.
 Frontier Marshal – starring Randolph Scott as Wyatt Earp, released in 1939.
 My Darling Clementine – directed by John Ford, about the lead up to and battle of the OK Corral, released in 1946.
 Gunfight at the O.K. Corral – directed by John Sturges, about the same events, released in 1957.
 Hour of the Gun'' – starring James Garner as Wyatt Earp, released in 1967.

References

External links

 
 
 

1994 films
1990s English-language films
1990s biographical films
1994 Western (genre) films
American biographical films
Biographical films about Wyatt Earp
American Western (genre) films
Films scored by James Newton Howard
Films directed by Lawrence Kasdan
Films about brothers
Films set in Tombstone, Arizona
Cultural depictions of Wyatt Earp
Cultural depictions of Doc Holliday
Cultural depictions of Bat Masterson
Cultural depictions of Big Nose Kate
Golden Raspberry Award winning films
Warner Bros. films
1990s American films